Lili Ország (8 August 1926 – 1 October 1978) was a Hungarian painter. Her works are included in the permanent collections of the following museums:
Ferenczy Museum, Szentendre
Municipal Gallery, Budapest
Herman Museum, Miskolc
St. Stephen Museum, Székesfehérvár
Israel Museum, Jerusalem
Janus Pannonius Museum, Pécs
Laczko D. Museum of Veszprem
Hungarian National Gallery, Budapest
Gallery of Szombathely, Szombathely

References 

1926 births
1978 deaths
20th-century Hungarian painters
Hungarian women painters
20th-century Hungarian women artists